Nughedu Santa Vittoria (in Sardinian just Nughedu) is a comune (municipality) in the Province of Oristano in the Italian region of Sardinia, located about  north of Cagliari and about  northeast of Oristano.

Nughedu Santa Vittoria borders the municipalities of Ardauli, Austis, Bidonì, Neoneli, Olzai and Sorradile. It is home to a number of prehistoric structures, including several domus de janas and a proto-nuraghe.

References

Cities and towns in Sardinia